Gejl is a Danish surname, and a danish middle name 

Notable people with the surname include:

 Mille Gejl (born 1999), Danish footballer
 Torsten Gejl (born 1964), Danish politician

See also
 Gejlarat (disambiguation)
 Gell

Surnames of Danish origin
Danish-language surnames